Platinum Triangle can refer to:
Platinum Triangle, Anaheim, California
Platinum Triangle, Los Angeles